Oakland Historic District is a national historic district in Oakland, Garrett County, Maryland. It is an L-shaped area in the central and older section of Oakland containing 206 buildings. They reflect the evolution of this rural county seat from the mid-19th to mid-20th centuries. It includes the Garrett County Courthouse, but the majority of the buildings are residential of frame construction and positioned with deep setbacks from the street, surrounded by large lawns. Several churches and schools and a library are scattered in the district.

It was added to the National Register of Historic Places in 1984.

References

External links

, including photo dated 1983, at Maryland Historical Trust
Boundary Map of the Oakland Historic District, Garrett County, at Maryland Historical Trust

Historic districts in Garrett County, Maryland
Historic districts on the National Register of Historic Places in Maryland
Oakland, Maryland
National Register of Historic Places in Garrett County, Maryland